The European Physical Journal (or EPJ) is a joint publication of EDP Sciences, Springer Science+Business Media, and the Società Italiana di Fisica. It arose in 1998 as a merger and continuation of Acta Physica Hungarica, Anales de Física, Czechoslovak Journal of Physics, Il Nuovo Cimento, Journal de Physique, Portugaliae Physica and Zeitschrift für Physik. The journal is published in various sections, covering all areas of physics.

History
In the late 1990s, Springer and EDP Sciences decided to merge Zeitschrift für Physik and Journal de Physique. With the addition of Il Nuovo Cimento from the Societa Italiana di Fisica, the European Physical Journal commenced publication in January 1998. Now EPJ is a merger and continuation of Acta Physica Hungarica, Anales de Fisica, Czechoslovak Journal of Physics, Il Nuovo Cimento, Journal de Physique, Portugaliae Physica and Zeitschrift für Physik.

The short-lived open-access journal family PhysMath Central was merged in 2011 into the European Physical Journal, which has offered an open-access option since 2006.

Topics covered
The EPJ is published in the following sections:

 European Physical Journal A: Hadrons and Nuclei
 : Applied Metamaterials
 : Applied Physics
 European Physical Journal B: Condensed Matter and Complex Systems
 European Physical Journal C: Particles and Fields
 European Physical Journal D: Atomic, Molecular, Optical and Plasma Physics
 : Data Science
 European Physical Journal E: Soft Matter and Biological Physics
 European Physical Journal H: Historical Perspectives on Contemporary Physics
 : Nuclear Sciences and Technologies
 : Nonlinear Biomedical Physics
 
 : Photovoltaics
 : Quantum Technology
 : Special Topics
 : Techniques and Instrumentation
 : Web of Conferences: journal of conference proceedings

References

External links

EPJ AP
EPJ Conferences
EPJ Data Science

Physics journals
Publications established in 1920
Springer Science+Business Media academic journals
EDP Sciences academic journals
English-language journals
Italian Physical Society academic journals
Academic journal series